The Droid series of phones are exclusive to Verizon Wireless. The branding "Droid" is a registered trademark of Lucasfilm that is licensed for Verizon's use. Many of these phones are also sold in other countries under different names (for example Motorola Droid is called Milestone in Europe); see under the individual articles for details.

History 
It was announced on July 23, 2013 that Motorola will now exclusively manufacture Droid phones for Verizon.

Phones 
 HTC Droid Eris – Released on November 6, 2009
 Motorola DroidReleased November 6, 2009
 HTC Droid IncredibleReleased on April 29, 2010
 Motorola Droid XReleased July 15, 2010
 Motorola Droid 2Released August 12, 2010
 Motorola Droid ProOptimized for business users, released November 18, 2010
 HTC Droid Incredible 2Released April, 2011
 Samsung Droid ChargeReleased May 14, 2011
 Motorola Droid X2Released May 19, 2011
 Motorola Droid 3Released July 7, 2011, shipping with 2.3.6 Gingerbread
 Motorola Droid BionicReleased September 8, 2011
 Motorola Droid RazrReleased November 11, 2011
 Motorola Droid Razr MaxxShipping January 26, 2012
 Motorola Droid 4Released February 10, 2012
 HTC Droid Incredible 4G LTEReleased July 5, 2012
 Motorola Droid Razr MReleased September 2012
 Motorola Droid Razr HDReleased October 18, 2012
 Motorola Droid Razr HD MaxxReleased October 18, 2012
 HTC Droid DNAReleased November 21, 2012
 Motorola Droid MaxxReleased July 23, 2013
 Motorola Droid UltraReleased July 23, 2013
 Motorola Droid MiniReleased July 23, 2013
 Motorola Droid TurboReleased October 28, 2014
 Motorola Droid Maxx 2Released October 27, 2015
 Motorola Droid Turbo 2Released October 27, 2015
 Moto Z DroidReleased July 2016
 Moto Z Force DroidReleased July 2016
 Moto Z Play DroidReleased September 8, 2016

References

External links 
 - DroidDoes

Verizon Wireless